Women & Songs 2 is the second album in the Women & Songs franchise. The album was released on December 8, 1998, and features 19 tracks. The album reached No. 2 on the Top Canadian Albums chart.

Track listing
 Surrounded (Chantal Kreviazuk) [4:20]
(performed by Chantal Kreviazuk)
 I Don't Want to Wait (Paula Cole) [4:06]
(performed by Paula Cole)
 Wishing I Was There (Campsie/Natalie Imbruglia/Phil Thornalley) [3:50]
(performed by Natalie Imbruglia)
 Dreams (Stevie Nicks) [3:59]
(performed by The Corrs)
 The Mummers' Dance [Edit] (Loreena McKennitt) [3:28]
(performed by Loreena McKennitt)
 Kind & Generous (Natalie Merchant) [4:03]
(performed by Natalie Merchant)
 Give Me One Reason (Tracy Chapman) [4:06]
(performed by Tracy Chapman)
 Strong Enough (David Baerwald/Bill Bottrell/Sheryl Crow/Kevin Gilbert/Brian MacLeod/David Ricketts) [3:09]
(performed by Sheryl Crow)
 Searchin' My Soul (Paul Gordon/Vonda Shepard) [4:25]
(performed by Vonda Shepard)
 Kiss the Rain (Eric Bazilian/Desmond Child/Billie Myers) [4:30]
(performed by Billie Myers)
 This Kiss (Beth Nielsen Chapman/Robin Lerner/Annie Roboff) [3:14]
(performed by Faith Hill)
 Birmingham (Dean McTaggart/Gerald O'Brien/David Tyson) [4:08]
(performed by Amanda Marshall)
 I Can't Make You Love Me (M. Reidd/A. Shamblin) [4:45]
(performed by Bonnie Raitt)
 Unchained Melody (Alex North/Hy Zaret) [4:46]
(performed by Sarah McLachlan)
 The Sound Of (Jann Arden Richards) [3:32]
(performed by Jann Arden)
 Who Will Save Your Soul (Jewel Kilcher) [3:59]
(performed by Jewel)
 You & I (Catherine Durand) [3:14]
(performed by Catherine Durand)
 Heroine (Kenneth Harrison) [4:07]
(performed by Wild Strawberries)
 I Know (Sarah Slean) [5:41]
(performed by Sarah Slean)

References
 [ Women & Songs 2 at AllMusic]

1998 compilation albums